Sir James Pliny Whitney  (October 2, 1843 – September 25, 1914) was a Canadian politician and lawyer in the province of Ontario. He served as Conservative member of the legislature for Dundas from 1888 and as the sixth premier of Ontario from 1905 until his death 1914. He is the only premier of Ontario to have died while in office.

Early life 
Whitney was born in Williamsburgh Township in 1843 and attended Cornwall Grammar School before articling at the law office of John Sandfield Macdonald in the 1860s, but did not resume his legal studies until 1871. He was called to the bar in 1875, and practised law in Morrisburg.
 
Whitney was active in the Militia at Cornwall, serving as a Private in a volunteer company during the Trent Affair and then a Sergeant with the Cornwall Volunteer Infantry during the Fenian Raids.

Early political career 
Whitney was elected to the Ontario legislature in 1888. He became leader of Ontario's Conservative Party in 1896.

Premiership 
In the 1905 election, he led his party to victory for the first time in 33 years by defeating the Liberal government of George William Ross.

Whitney's government laid the basis for Ontario's industrial development by creating the Hydro-Electric Power Commission of Ontario, with Sir Adam Beck as its chairman and driving force. His government also passed significant temperance and workmen's compensation legislation. He also supported the anti-Catholic and anti-French-Canadian sentiments of supporters of the Orange Order in his caucus (such as George Howard Ferguson) by passing Regulation 17, which banned the teaching of French in schools beyond the first three years of school. The measure inflamed French-Canadian opinion across Canada, particularly in Quebec, and divided the country as it entered World War I.

Death and legacy 
Whitney died in office shortly after he had won the 1914 election. Whitney had a suspected heart attack during his convalescence in New York City in 1913 and returned to Toronto staying at Toronto General Hospital.

A 1920s government building across from Queen's Park is named the Whitney Block after him. A statue of him stands on the Queen's Park grounds.  Whitney Hall, a residential building at nearby University College, of the University of Toronto, is also named after him.

References

External links 
 
 
 Ontario Plaques - Sir James Pliny Whitney
 Sir James Whitney fonds, Archives of Ontario

1843 births
1914 deaths
Canadian Anglicans
Canadian Knights Commander of the Order of St Michael and St George
Canadian King's Counsel
Leaders of the Progressive Conservative Party of Ontario
Lawyers in Ontario
Premiers of Ontario